The 2010 Wales Rally GB, was the thirteenth and final round of the 2010 World Rally Championship (WRC) season. The twenty stage gravel rally took place over 11–14 November 2010 and was based in the Welsh capital of Cardiff. The rally was the final event for two-litre World Rally Cars as the 2011 season will see the introduction of 1.6-litre World Rally Cars.

Sébastien Loeb won his eighth event of the season and the 62nd WRC rally of his career after holding off Petter Solberg by under 20 seconds. Jari-Matti Latvala finished third to secure second place in the drivers' championship.

Armindo Araújo finished second – behind Ott Tänak – in the PWRC class to claim his second successive championship, while Xavier Pons claimed the inaugural SWRC championship taking third on the rally behind Andreas Mikkelsen and Craig Breen.

Introduction
The rally started with a super special stage being held at the Cardiff Bay Barrage on the Thursday evening. Friday and Saturday saw the rally complete fourteen stages in Mid Wales, with servicing at Builth Wells, before another super special stage at Cardiff Bay. Sunday had a further four stages in the South Wales area.

Results

Event standings

Special stages

Standings after the rally

Drivers' Championship standings

Manufacturers' Championship standings

References

External links 
 The official website for the rally
 The official website of the World Rally Championship

Wales
Wales Rally GB
Wales Rally GB
Wales Rally GB
Rally GB